The 2022 Cavan Senior Football Championship was the 113th edition of Cavan GAA's premier Gaelic football tournament for senior graded clubs in County Cavan, Ireland. The championship started on 12 August 2022. The tournament consists of 12 teams, with the winner going on to represent Cavan in the Ulster Senior Club Football Championship.

Ramor United were the defending champions, but were dethroned by Killygarry in the semi-final, who reached their first senior final since 1971.

Gowna beat Killygarry in the final to claim their 8th title and their first since 2002.

Team changes
The following teams changed division since the 2021 championship season.

To Championship
Promoted from 2021 Cavan Intermediate Football Championship
  Butlersbridge - (Intermediate Champions)

From Championship
Relegated to 2022 Cavan Intermediate Football Championship
  Shercock - (Relegation play-off Losers)
  Castlerahan - (Relegation play-off Losers)

League stage
All 12 teams enter the competition at this stage. A random draw determines which teams face each other in each of the four rounds. No team can meet each other twice in the group stage. The top eight teams go into the quarter-finals, while the bottom four teams enter the relegation play-offs.

Round 1

Round 2

Round 3

Round 4

Knock-Out Stage

Quarter-finals

Semi-finals

Final

Relegation play-offs
The 4 bottom placed teams the league phase will play off against each other. The 2 winners will maintain their senior status for 2023 while the 2 losers will advance to the relegation final. The loser will be relegated to the 2023 Intermediate Championship.

References

External links
 Official Cavan GAA Website

Cavan Senior
Cavan
Cavan Senior Football Championship
Cavan GAA Football championships